In Roman mythology, Virtus was the deity of bravery and military strength, the personification of the Roman virtue of virtus.  The Greek equivalent deity was Arete. The deity was identified with the Roman god Honos (personification of honour) and was often honoured together with him, such as in the Temple of Virtus and Honos at the Porta Capena in Rome.

The deity was represented in a variety of ways, for example, on the coins of Tetricus, they could appear as a matron, an old man, or a young man, with a javelin, battle helmet, or only clothed in a cape. Within the realm of funerary reliefs Virtus is never shown without a male companion. Often their presence within this realm of art is to compliment and provide assistance to the protagonist of the relief during a scene of intense masculinity or bravery.

Modern era
In the United States in 1776, Virtus was made the central figure in the Seal of Virginia and the subsequent state flag, which features the seal. The Virginia four-dollar note, a Continental currency, had a similar Virtus pictured on its obverse.

See also
Hercules at the crossroads

References

Roman deities
Roman gods
Roman goddesses
War gods
War goddesses
Personifications in Roman mythology